Aaron Milton (born May 26, 1992) is a Canadian football running back. He was drafted by the Edmonton Eskimos in the second round of the 2014 CFL Draft. He played CIS football at the University of Toronto and attended Sinclair Secondary School in Whitby, Ontario.

Early years
Milton played high school football at Sinclair Secondary School. He earned athlete of the year honours three times and football most valuable player honours twice.

College career
Milton played for the Toronto Varsity Blues from 2010 to 2013. He played in six games his freshman year in 2010, rushing for 247 yards and two touchdowns while recording nineteen receptions for 139 yards. He also punted nine times. Milton appeared in eight games in 2011, rushing for 524 yards and two touchdowns while catching twelve passes for 188 yards. He didn't play in 2012. He played in eight games his senior season in 2013, rushing for 603 yards and one touchdown while also totaling nine receptions for 62 yards. Milton also completed a 30-yard pass attempt to Alex Pierzchalski on a trick play that went for a touchdown in 2013.

Professional career
Milton was selected by the Edmonton Eskimos with the fifteenth pick in the 2014 CFL Draft. He played in three games as a reserve fullback for the Eskimos his rookie year in 2014. He played in five games for the team in 2015, accumulating two special teams tackles. Milton recorded a tackle in the West final as well. The Eskimos won the 103rd Grey Cup against the Ottawa Redblacks by a score of 26-20 on November 29, 2015.

On February 15, 2017, Milton signed with the Saskatchewan Roughriders. After retiring from football just three months later, Milton started a comeback in 2019, when he signed with the Lübeck Cougars in the German Football League 2 (GFL2).

Personal life
Milton's mother played college basketball and his father played semi-professional soccer. Aaron's sister was a member of the soccer national development program.

References

External links
Just Sports Stats

Living people
1992 births
Canadian football running backs
Toronto Varsity Blues football players
Edmonton Elks players
Saskatchewan Roughriders players
Players of Canadian football from Ontario
Sportspeople from Whitby, Ontario